Funoon al Jazeera (in Arabic فنون الجزيرة) is an Arab music production company that has signed a number of Arab artists.

It was established in 1980 by artist Talal Maddah and ownership was later transferred to artist Rashed Al-Majed.

The company keeps the ownership of the archive of its founder Talal Maddah.

Artists
Talal Maddah - deceased
Rashed Al-Majed - owner, CEO
Mohammed Abdu
Abass Ibrahim
Abdallah Al Rowaished

References

Arab record labels
Record labels established in 1980